The Grand Prix Dobrich was a road cycling race held in Bulgaria. The race consisted of two one day races. It was part of UCI Europe Tour in category 1.2.

Winners

Grand Prix Dobrich I

Grand Prix Dobrich II

References

UCI Europe Tour races
Recurring sporting events established in 2012
2012 establishments in Bulgaria
2012 disestablishments in Bulgaria
Cycle races in Bulgaria
Defunct cycling races in Bulgaria